Jan Krzysztof Ardanowski (born 11 February 1961, in Czernikowo) is a Polish politician, farmer and former local government official.

After graduating from the University of Technology and Life Sciences in Bydgoszcz, where he was active in the Independent Students’ Association, Ardanowski began managing a farm in Krobia and was elected to the regional legislature of the Kuyavian-Pomeranian Voivodeship. Initially aligned with the Peasants' Agreement, he joined the Law and Justice party in 2001.

In the years 2003-2007, Ardanowski was the president of the National Council of Agricultural Chambers. He is now in his third term as an MP. In the Sejm, Ardanowski was the vice chair of the Committee on Agriculture and Rural Development. He assumed office as the minister of agriculture and rural development on 20 June 2018, serving under Mateusz Morawiecki.

Outside of politics and agriculture, Ardanowski has studied the fate of the Jewish women at the Stutthof concentration camp, forced into slave labor in Bocień. He coauthored a book on this topic with Paweł Sztama.

References

Law and Justice politicians
Agriculture ministers of Poland
Living people
1961 births